Calophyllum piluliferum is a species of flowering plant in the Calophyllaceae family. It is found in West Papua (Indonesia) and Papua New Guinea.

References

Data deficient plants
Flora of Papua New Guinea
Flora of Western New Guinea
piluliferum
Taxonomy articles created by Polbot